A constituent assembly (also known as a constitutional convention, constitutional congress, or constitutional assembly) is a body assembled for the purpose of drafting or revising a constitution. Members of a constituent assembly may be elected by popular vote, drawn by sortition, appointed, or some combination of these methods. Assemblies are typically considered distinct from a regular legislature, although members of the legislature may compose a significant number or all of its members.  As the fundamental document constituting a state, a constitution cannot normally be modified or amended by the state's normal legislative procedures in some jurisdictions; instead a constitutional convention or a constituent assembly, the rules for which are normally laid down in the constitution, must be set up. A constituent assembly is usually set up for its specific purpose, which it carries out in a relatively short time, after which the assembly is dissolved. A constituent assembly is a form of representative democracy.

Unlike forms of constitution-making in which a constitution is unilaterally imposed by a sovereign lawmaker, the constituent assembly creates a constitution through "internally imposed" actions, in that members of the constituent assembly are themselves citizens, but not necessarily the political leaders, of the country for which they are creating a constitution. As described by Columbia University Social Sciences Professor Jon Elster:

"Constitutions arise in a number of different ways.  At the non-democratic extreme of the spectrum, we may imagine a sovereign lawgiver laying down the constitution for all later generations.  At the democratic extreme, we may imagine a constituent assembly elected by universal suffrage for the sole task of writing a new constitution.  And there are all sorts of intermediate arrangements."

By Country

Australia 
Australia held four constitutional conventions, one each in 1891, 1897, 1973, and 1998

Chile 

As of May 2021 Chile is the most recently elected constitutional assembly. The 155 members of this assembly were elected between 15 and 16 May 2021. The assembly has gender parity (50% females and 50% males) and has 17 seats reserved for people belonging to indigenous peoples. The assembly is granted 12 months to draft a new constitution, which has to be ratified by referendum once written, with compulsory voting.

Costa Rica 

Immediately after the 1948 Costa Rican Civil War that overthrew the Rafael Angel Calderón Government, the leaders of the victorious side called for the election of a Constituent Assembly in the same year. The Assembly successfully drafted and approved the current Costa Rican Constitution.

Denmark

The Danish Constituent Assembly (lit. The Constitution giving Assembly of the Realm) of 1848 established the Constitution of Denmark in 1849 (lit. The Constitutional Act of the Realm of Denmark) and formalized the transition from absolute monarchy to constitutional monarchy. The assembly consisted of members of which 114 were directly elected in October 1848, 38 were appointed by the king and the rest were government ministers. The constituent assembly met at Christiansborg Palace in Copenhagen and first met on 23 October 1848. The assembly was overall split in three different groupings: the National liberals, the Friends of Peasants, and the Conservatives. A key topic for discussion was the political system, and the rules governing elections. On 25 May 1849, the constituent assembly approved the new constitution, and on 5 June 1849 it was signed by King Frederick VII. For this reason, it is also known as the June constitution. Today, 5 June is known as Constitution Day in Denmark.

European Union 
The European Convention (2001)  drafted the Constitution for Europe for approval by the European Council and ratification by the member states. This constitution was abandoned after being rejected in French and Dutch referendums, and was replaced by the Treaty of Lisbon in 2007

France 

During the French Revolution (from July 1789 to September 1791) a National Constituent Assembly was formed when representatives assembled at the only location available – a tennis court – and swore the Tennis Court Oath on June 20, 1789, promising that they would not adjourn until they had drafted a new constitution for France. Louis XVI recognized the validity of the National Constituent Assembly on June 27, 1789.

See also 1848 French Constituent Assembly election

Germany 
Parlamentarischer Rat (Parliamentary Council) (1948) – Drafted the Basic Law of the Federal Republic for ratification by the Länder. This council was not recognized as legitimate by Soviet-occupied East Germany, which drafted its own constitution in 1949 and would not accept the Basic Law until German reunification in 1990.

Iceland 
On 27 November 2010, Iceland held an election for a constitutional assembly, with 522 people competing for 25 delegate seats. The assembly, in session for four months from early April until late July 2011, drafted a new constitution and passed it unanimously with 25 votes and no abstentions. On 20 October 2012 the parliament put the bill to a national referendum, in which 67% of the voters supported the bill. Further, 67% of the voters supported equal voting rights (one person, one vote) and 83% supported national ownership of natural resources, two key provisions of the bill. Parliament has failed to ratify the bill, however, inviting accusations that the political class is trying to thwart the will of the people by disrespecting the result of the 2012 constitutional referendum.

Ireland 
In Ireland, the government elected in March 2011 has committed to establishing constitutional amendments on six specified issues and others it may consider; the government has separately promised amendments on five other issues.

India 

The Constituent Assembly of India was elected to write the Constitution of India, and served as its first Parliament as an independent nation. It was set up as a result of negotiations between the leaders of the Indian independence movement and members of the British Cabinet Mission. The constituent assembly was elected indirectly by the members of the Provincial legislative assembly, which existed under the British Raj. It first met on December 9, 1946, in Delhi. On August 15, 1947, India became an independent nation, and the Constituent Assembly started functioning as India's Parliament. B. R. Ambedkar drafted the Constitution of India in conjunction with the requisite deliberations and debates in the Constituent Assembly. The Assembly approved the Constitution on November 26, 1949 (celebrated as Constitution Day), and it took effect on January 26, 1950 — a day now commemorated as Republic Day in India. Once the Constitution took effect, the Constituent Assembly became the Provisional Parliament of India.

Indonesia 

The Constitutional Assembly of Indonesia was established to draw up a permanent constitution. Its membership was elected in November 1955, and it met for the first time in November 1956. After four sessions, it failed to agree on the fundamental basis for the state. It was dissolved in 1959, and the original constitution imposed by presidential decree.(OTP)

Italy

The Constituent Assembly of Italy was established in 1946 in the wake of Fascist Italy's defeat during World War II. It was elected with universal suffrage, simultaneously with a referendum about the adoption of Republic or the continuation of monarchy. Voters chose Republic, and the new assembly had the task to approve the new republic governments, as well as to write a new constitution. This was approved on 22 December 1947.

It was dissolved on 31 January 1948, to be replaced by the new Parliament of Italy.

Mexico 
The Viceroyalty of New Spain sent deputies to the Cortes of Cadiz, which enacted the 1812 Constitution. By the time this Constitution was enacted, an insurgency fighting for independence from Spain was already established.

The first Constituent Congress of independent Mexico, known as the Congress of Anahuac, was first gathered in Chilpancingo whilst the war of independence was still ongoing. During the opening of Congress, José María Morelos outlined its program in a document called Sentimientos de la Nación (Feelings of the Nation), which was the first antecedent of the various Constitutions of Mexico. Being persecuted by royalist troops, the Congress fled Chilpancingo and gathered in Apatzingán.

On October 22, 1814, the Congress enacted the Constitutional Decree for the Liberty of Mexican America (Decreto Constitucional para la Libertad de la América Mexicana), known as the Constitution of Apatzingán. The 1814 Constitution entered into force in the territories dominated by the insurgents, but as the war continued and the first insurgent leaders (like Morelos) were defeated, it was largely forgotten.

After independence was consummated on September 27, 1821, and based on the Plan de Iguala and the Treaty of Córdoba, the Provisional Governing Junta was stablished. The Junta proclaimed the Act of Independence of the Mexican Empire and acted as a de facto legislative assembly until February 24, 1822, when the Constituent Congress was gathered. On May 19, 1822, the Constituent Congress proclaimed Agustín de Iturbide as Emperor. The relations between Emperor and Congress were always problematic, a situation that led to the dissolution of Congress by Iturbide on October 31, 1822, without a formal Constitution being enacted.

After the dissolution of Congress, Iturbide created the National Instituent Junta, which enacted the Provisional Political Bylaws of the Mexican Empire on December 18, 1822. The dissolution of Congress had resulted in an armed revolution under the Plan de Casa Mata, which called for the establishment of a Federal Republic and for the restoration of the Constituent Congress. Iturbide was forced to abdicate and he reinstalled the Constituent Congress.

The Congress then created a provisional government, called the Triumvirate, and enacted the Constituent Act of the Mexican Federation, by which the former Provinces of Mexico were transformed into free and sovereign States. After this, a Constituent Congress was formed with the participation of the States and it enacted the 1824 Constitution.

Many disputes aroused between federalists and centralists, which resulted in political instability and in 1836 the Siete Leyes (Seven Laws) were enacted. The Siete Leyes dissolved the federation and created a unitary republic, but that ended in 1846 when the Constitutive and Reforms Act was enacted and the 1824 Constitution, and thus the federation, was restored.

On October 16, 1854, President Juan Álvarez, under the Plan de Ayutla, decreed the formation of another Constituent Congress, which met in 1856. During the presidency of Ignacio Comonfort, the Constituent Congress enacted the 1857 Constitution, which was liberal in character. The Constitution was not well received by the church and Mexican conservatives, and the Plan de Tacubaya called for its derogation. This events led to the Reform War, which the liberals won, then restoring the 1857 Constitution and adding to it the Reform Laws.

After the Porfiriato, and whilst the Mexican Revolution was still being fought, President Venustiano Carranza formed a Constituent Congress, which met in Querétaro and enacted the still-current Political Constitution of the United Mexican States of 1917.

Nepal 

Nepal had two Constituent assemblies, the last one being elected after its predecessor failed to deliver a constitution, despite multiple extensions. It also served as the country's parliament.
Finally Nepal had made constitution with 89% majority. Nepal has adopted Federalism since.

Poland 
The Great Sejm (also known as Four-Year Sejm) was held between 1788 and 1792. Its principal aim became to restore sovereignty to, and reform, the federative Polish-Lithuanian Commonwealth politically and economically. These attempts were made by writing Constitution of 3 May 1791 that was designed to redress long-standing political defects of the Commonwealth and its system of Golden Liberties. The constitution lasted for merely a year because of the Polish-Russian War of 1792 and the Third Partition of Poland.

Philippines 
The Philippines has had several conventions:

 1898 - drafted the 1898 Malolos Constitution, the basic law of the First Philippine Republic, the first constitutional republic in Asia.  The drafted constitution was written by Felipe Calderón y Roca and Felipe Buencamino as an alternative to a pair of proposals to the Malolos Congress by Apolinario Mabini and Pedro Paterno. After a lengthy debate in the latter part of 1898, it was enacted on 21 January 1899.
 1935 – to draft a constitution to create the autonomous Commonwealth of the Philippines under the U.S. Tydings–McDuffie Act. The constitution was also used in the 3rd Republic (1946) until the passage of the 1973 constitution. Members were elected through the 1934 Philippine Constitutional Convention election
 1971 – to draft a revised constitution to replace the old U.S. 1935 Philippine constitution. Members were elected through the 1970 Philippine Constitutional Convention election. The system of government changed from presidential to parliamentary to presidential-parliamentary (in 1984 amendment). 
 1986 – The ex-constitution lasted until the downfall of Ferdinand Marcos in 1986 and Corazon Aquino appointed members to draft the 1987 Constitution through the 1986 Commission.

Russia 

The Russian Constituent Assembly was established in Russia in the wake of the October Revolution of 1917 to form a new constitution after the overthrow of the Russian Provisional Government.

Sri Lanka
The Sri Lankan Parliament approved the creation of a Sri Lankan Constitutional Assembly on March 9, 2016, proposed by Prime Minister Ranil Wickramasinghe. The assembly will draft a new constitution for Sri Lanka.

Turkey
Constituent Assembly of Turkey was established in 1961 after the 1960 Turkish coup d'état to prepare a democratic constitution. The constitution was prepared and approved by the voters in a referendum of 1961.

United States

Federal

The U.S. Constitutional Convention  drafted the still-current United States Constitution in 1787.  Its delegates were appointed by the states, not directly elected, and not all states sent delegates; moreover, the convention was originally charged with drafting amendments to the Articles of Confederation rather than a new constitution.

The US Constitution contains no provision for its own replacement (and because of the presence of entrenched clauses it cannot be revoked through an amendment). Article V of the Constitution does permit Congress to appoint a national constitutional convention to propose amendments but it has never done so. While Congress has the option to submit both its own proposals for amendments and those of a national convention to state conventions rather than the state legislatures for ratification; this process has been used only once (for the Twenty-first Amendment).

States

A long tradition in the use of constituent assemblies exists at the state level of Constitutionalism. In fact, constituent assemblies met in the states before the formation of the Federal Constitution in 1787 as well as after its ratification. Since 1776 nearly 150 state constitutional conventions have met to draft or revise state constitutions.

These early state constitutional conventions frequently did not use procedural steps like popular ratification that became commonplace in the mid-19th century.  Yet they were considered to be constituent assemblies that exercised their authority as that of the people. As American Sovereigns: The People and America's Constitutional Tradition Before the Civil War by Christian G. Fritz notes:.
"A legitimate constitution depended on whether the sovereign people authorized it, not whether a particular procedure was used or whether revolutionary conventions were free of other responsibilities, such as passing ordinary legislation. It was the people as the sovereign who authorized drafting those first [state] constitutions that gave them their legitimacy, not whether they used procedures that matched what was later understood to be necessary to create fundamental law." 

American state constituent assemblies in the 19th and 20th centuries reflected many qualities of a citizen's movement.  From the start of state American constitution-making, delegates to constitutional conventions studied earlier state models of constitutions.  They often self-consciously "borrow[ed]" constitutional text and provisions from other states.  They often used in their drafting and debates compact and pocket-sized compilations of all the existing American constitutions, so that the constituent's assembly could draw upon the latest in constitutional design. The powers of these state constituent assemblies were also highly contested, with some claiming that they had unlimited legal power and others claiming that they must operate within the pre-existing legal landscape.  In the end, a common law of constituent power emerged which held that elected constituent assemblies had limited powers.

Several U.S. states have held multiple conventions over the years to change their particular state's constitutions.

 Missouri has held four, in 1820, 1865, 1875 and 1945.
 Michigan has held four, in 1835, 1850, 1908 and 1963.
 Massachusetts has held six, in 1778, 1779–80, 1820–21, 1853, 1917–18, and most recently 2016.
 The Constitution of New York has been amended, or re-established de novo, through nine Constitutional Conventions: in 1776–1777, 1801, 1821, 1846, 1867–1868, 1894, 1915, 1938, and 1967; a Constitutional Commission in 1872–1873; and a Judicial Convention in 1921.
 Vermont's first constitution was drafted by a convention that met in July 1777 and revised by a convention that met in 1786, both of these conventions occurring when Vermont was still independent of the United States. Vermont was admitted into the United States in 1791 and its government continued to function under the 1786 constitution. Two years later in 1793 held another convention to bring some provisions of its constitution into line with the Constitution of the United States.
 Virginia Conventions have included six unlimited meetings. Constitutions were promulgated by fiat in 1776, 1864 and 1901–02, and ratified by referendum in 1829–30, 1850, and 1868. Limited Conventions and Constitutional Commissions resulting in revisions were held in 1927, 1945, 1956 and 1968. Subsequently, the state legislature proposes amendments that are ratified in popular referendum.

State Constitutional Conventions 
All 50 states have had at least one Constitutional Convention, numbering over 233. 11 were illegal and defeated by arms (Confederacy and Dorr's Rebellion). 12 were illegal and won through arms (Revolutionary War, Republic of Texas, and Vermont Republic). 37 were made in accordance with a Federal enabling law.

Countries without an entrenched constitution
A few countries do not have an entrenched constitution, which can thus be amended by normal legislative procedures; the United Kingdom, New Zealand and Israel are examples. In these countries there is no need to call constituent assemblies, and no provision to do so, as the legislature can effectively modify the constitution.

Although it lacks a written constitution, the United Kingdom has had several conventions at the subnational level including:

 Northern Ireland Constitutional Convention (1975–1976) – a failed attempt to find a solution to the status of Northern Ireland.
 Scottish Constitutional Convention (1989) – produced a plan for Scottish devolution.

The constitution of New Zealand consists of a collection of statutes (Acts of Parliament), Treaties, Orders-in-Council, Letters Patent, decisions of the Courts and unwritten constitutional conventions. Because it is not supreme law, the constitution is comparatively easy to reform, requiring only a majority of Members of Parliament to amend it.

The constitutional law of Israel is determined by the Knesset which, since 1949, serves as the country's ongoing constituent assembly. The Knesset has the power to create Basic Laws of Israel, laws which are entrenched legislation and will become part of a "future" constitution of Israel, as well as "regular" statutory legislation.

See also

List of constituent assemblies
Convention parliament
Constituent Cortes
National Constituent Assembly (disambiguation)
Third Dáil, also called the Constituent Assembly

References

 
American constitutional conventions